Aegiale may refer to:
 Aegiale (Amorgos), an ancient town of Amorgos
 Aegiale (wife of Diomedes), a daughter of Adrastus and Amphithea, or of Aegialeus the son of Adrastus, in Greek mythology
 Aegiale (daughter of Helios), the daughter of Helios and Clymene in Greek mythology
 Aegiale (butterfly), a genus of skipper butterflies